Cygne may refer to:
 La Cygne, Kansas, a city in Linn County, Kansas
 "Le cygne", a movement of The Carnival of the Animals by Camille Saint-Saëns
 Le Cygne (journal), a scholarly journal published by the International Marie de France Society

See also
 Île des Cygnes (disambiguation)
 Marais des Cygnes (disambiguation)
 Île aux Cygnes, a small island in the Seine in Paris, France
 Cygne blanc, a white-berried seedling of Cabernet Sauvignon discovered in Swan Valley, Western Australia
 Danse des petits cygnes, a dance from the ballet Swan Lake by Tchaikovsky
 Notre-Dame-des-Missions-du-cygne d'Enghien, a French Roman Catholic church